The Southern Claims Commission (SCC) was an organization of the executive branch of the United States government from 1871 to 1880, created under President Ulysses S. Grant. Its purpose was to allow Union sympathizers who had lived in the Southern states during the American Civil War, 1861–1865, to apply for reimbursements for property losses due to U.S. Army confiscations during the war.

Application process
Southerners from 12 states (West Virginia, Virginia, North Carolina, South Carolina, Georgia, Florida, Tennessee, Alabama, Mississippi, Louisiana, Arkansas, and Texas) filed claims with the Southern Claims Commission from 1871 to 1873 if they:
 were loyal to the United States during the Civil War
 had supplies officially taken by or furnished to the U.S. Army in the war

Southern Loyalists (those who were Union sympathizers) made 22,298 claims. Only 32 percent of the claims (7,092) were approved for payment. The claimants used the testimony of their neighbors as evidence of their U.S. loyalty and property losses. The applications of claimants (successful or not), testimony, and the SCC papers provide excellent historical background information about Southern life during the Civil War.

Although only a few people per county qualified for a settlement, the application papers of the Southern Claims Commission typically include questions mentioning hundreds of their neighbors. Neighbors of all races, and classes were questioned and discussed in SCC records, potentially including:
 personal descriptions, and accounts of events during the war
 military records of claimants, or their relatives
 letters, diaries, and family Bible records
 wills, property inventories, and probate records

References

External links
Gary B. Mills, "U.S. Southern Claims Commission Master Index, 1871–1880" on Ancestry.com.
"Southern Claims Commission" in FamilySearch Research Wiki. Includes an advanced search strategy for genealogists.
St. Louis County Library, "Researching Southern Claims Commission Records" in St. Louis County Library. Many of the NARA descriptive publications are online at this website including the next item.
St. Louis County Library, "Geographical List of Southern Claims Commission Claimants" in St. Louis County Library. Use this list to find all the applicants in a given county.
Fold3, a subscription site, available at some libraries, has an index to SCC records.

United States government oversight of the American Civil War
Southern Unionists in the American Civil War
Defunct agencies of the United States government
Reconstruction Era
1871 establishments in the United States
Presidency of Ulysses S. Grant
Reparations